This is a list of Canadian Football League (CFL) seasons, including seasons in Canadian football prior to the CFL's founding in 1958.

Pre-CFL seasons

CFL seasons

Early CFL (1958–1986) 
After the merger of the Big Four and WIFU, the first 29 CFL seasons each consisted of 9 teams playing in the same 9 cities. In 1961, inter-conference play began during the regular season.  Until 1973, Western Canadian teams played 16 games, compared to 14 for Eastern Canada. Since then, all teams played 16 games per season until the season was expanded to 18 games in 1986.

Current era (1987–present) 
Since 1987, the number of teams has changed several times, but the CFL has retained an 18 game schedule. Since 2014, the CFL includes nine teams in the same cities as it had from 1958 to 1986.

Notes

References

External links
 Canadian Football League
 SOUDOG'S CFL HISTORY FAN SITE
 CFL Player of the Year
 The Sports Network
 CFL Helmets 
 All-time CFL Standings Since 1945

 
Seasons